Two ships of the Royal Navy have borne the name HMS Talavera:

 was an 74-gun third rate, launched in 1818 and destroyed by fire in 1840
, originally ordered as the Talavera but was renamed on the stocks after the Battle of Waterloo

Royal Navy ship names